Fort Snelling State Park is a state park of the U.S. state of Minnesota, at the confluence of the Mississippi and Minnesota rivers. For many centuries, the area of the modern park has been of importance to the Mdewakanton Dakota people who consider it the center of the earth. The state park, which opened in 1962, is named for the historic Fort Snelling, which dates from 1820. The fort structure is maintained and operated by the Minnesota Historical Society. The bulk of the state park preserves the bottomland forest, rivers, and backwater lakes below the river bluffs. Both the state and historic fort structure are part of the Mississippi National River and Recreation Area, a National Park Service site.

These trails connect the park to the Minnesota Valley National Wildlife Refuge, Minnehaha Park, and regional trail systems like the Grand Rounds Scenic Byway and the Big Rivers Regional Trail. Minnesota State Highway 55 crosses over the park on the Mendota Bridge, and many jets taking off and landing at the Minneapolis–Saint Paul International Airport fly directly over the park.

Landscape 
Today the bottomlands of the river confluence boast a floodplain forest of cottonwood, silver maple, green ash, wood nettle, jewelweed, and willow.  There are also marshes, backwater lakes, and wet meadows.  Abundant wildlife includes white-tailed deer, fox, woodchuck, badger, skunk, turkey, and coyote. Reptiles include the snapping turtle, painted turtle, soft-shelled turtle, and the non-venomous western fox snake.  In 1864 a railroad was built through the area, connecting St. Paul with the riverboat landing.

History 
At the beginning of historical times, Mdewakanton Dakota lived in this area.  The confluence of the Mississippi and Minnesota rivers was to them the center of the world.  In 1805 Lieutenant Zebulon Pike met with the Mdewakanton on the island between the two rivers and negotiated the purchase of land along the blufftops.  The treaty site is now known as Pike Island.  Details of Fort Snelling, which was built between 1820 and 1825 on the land Pike acquired, are contained in its own entry.

The soldiers from Fort Snelling had gardens, livestock, bakery, and boat storage sheds in the low river valley.  After the Dakota War of 1862, over 1600 Dakota men, women, and children were forcibly confined in a camp in this area through the winter of 1862–1863, before being expelled to Nebraska.  Over the winter, approximately 300 died due to malnutrition, disease, and exposure.

During the 1950s, the state government had planned to build a freeway interchange and bridge over the site of the fort, prompting concerned locals and Russell W. Fridley, director of the Minnesota Historical Society, to call a meeting to examine how to preserve the fort. Eventually, the state agreed to build a tunnel underneath the fort, thus preserving the old structures. In 1960, A.R. Nichols, a landscape architect, submitted plans for a  park on the site. Based on a much earlier plan, this design would become the basis for the final form of the park. This caught the interest of Thomas C. Savage who wrote State Parks director U.W. Hella.  Hella urged Savage to form an association of interested citizens which became the Fort Snelling State Park Association, putting money and public relations effort into the promotion of the park's establishment. While there was widespread support for preserving the old fortifications, some local landowners were not enthused about plans to purchase additional lands, claiming that the price the government proposed to pay was not adequate. In response, the Park Association began to raise funds privately to buy out at least some of the owners. A second consideration was whether or not the federal government would grant the actual fort property to the state as surplus land.

On the last day of the 1961 legislative session, a $65,000 appropriation was made and the park's boundaries were set (on a much smaller scale than can be seen today) so as to acquire the federal land. On October 29, the federal government donated  of land, including portions of the fort, to the State of Minnesota under the 1944 Surplus Property Act. The park was officially opened on June 3, 1962.

The restoration of the fort had begun as early as 1957, and with the establishment of the park, such efforts received new momentum. Old plans were found in the National Archives and the state legislature granted regular appropriations to fund the project until 1979. Limestone to match the original building material was taken from lands owned by the City of Saint Paul and the Webb Publishing Company. Eventually, the remaining half of the fort, which had been occupied by the Department of Veterans Affairs was also donated to the park and restoration of the entire fort could proceed. Structures including walls, the round tower, barracks, the commandant's house, gatehouse, magazine, school, and others were either restored or rebuilt to 19th-century condition. Workers went so far as to recreate the rough trowel tuckpointing of the original stone blocks. Controversially, WPA murals from the 1930s were removed from the interior of the tower.

In 1970 a swimming beach was opened in the park and visitation increased by 75%.  An interpretive center was opened in 1974, the first year-round interpretive center in the Minnesota state park system.  Even without a campground, this is the most visited state park in Minnesota for most years.

Recreation
Bicycling:  of paved trail, connecting to regional paved trails.   of gravel trails.
Boating: Public boat ramp on Minnesota River by picnic area.  Canoe access to lakes and rivers.
Cross-country skiing:  of groomed ski trails in the park.
Fishing: Lake and river fishing.  Fishing pier on Snelling Lake.
Hiking:  of hiking trails in the park.
Interpretation:
Thomas C. Savage Visitor Center with exhibits and year-round programs, operated by the Minnesota Department of Natural Resources.
Tours of historic Fort Snelling (separate fee), operated by the Minnesota Historical Society.
Sports:
Minneapolis Parks and Recreation operates a nine-hole golf course and a sports field west of the fort, on its historic polo ground.
2 playgrounds, by beach and by picnic area.
Park office lends beach volleyball equipment.
Swimming: Beach on Snelling Lake.
Weddings and funerals: The Fort Snelling Memorial Chapel, built in 1926, is reservable.
No camping. The park is day-use only, open from 8am to 10pm.

See also
Fort Snelling
Minnehaha Trail
Minnesota Valley National Wildlife Refuge
Minnesota Valley State Trail
Mississippi National River and Recreation Area
Winchell Trail

References

Meyer, Roy W.  Everyone's Country Estate: A History of Minnesota's State Parks.  Minnesota Historical Society Press: St. Paul, 1991.
Minnesota Department of Natural Resources. 2006. The Minnesota Department of Natural Resources Web Site (online).
 Morgan, Samuel H. "Birth, Death, and Reincarnation: The Story of Fort Snelling and Its State Park." Ramsey County History, Vol. 28, No. 2. Summer 1993. pp 4–12, 27.
Nissen, Ruth et al.  "Glaciers Left Their Mark on the Mississippi River."

External links

 Fort Snelling State Park

1962 establishments in Minnesota
Minnesota River
Mississippi Gorge
Mississippi National River and Recreation Area
Protected areas established in 1962
Protected areas of Dakota County, Minnesota
Protected areas of Hennepin County, Minnesota
Protected areas of Ramsey County, Minnesota
Protected areas on the Mississippi River
State parks of Minnesota